Live at Jittery Joe's is a live album released in 2001 by Jeff Mangum of Neutral Milk Hotel to combat the high prices of bootlegs on eBay. Filmmaker Lance Bangs recorded it at the Athens, GA venue Jittery Joe's on March 7, 1997, during a live solo performance; this location was the original Jittery Joe's at 243 W. Washington St., not one of the current locations. Jeff had not prepared a setlist, so some of the songs were chosen by the audience. A noisy child can be heard throughout the performance (most notably during "Oh Comely").

Most of the songs included on this album had studio versions on earlier Neutral Milk Hotel releases, except for a cover of Phil Spector's "I Love How You Love Me." This album contains a different, earlier version of "Two-Headed Boy, Pt. Two" than appears on In the Aeroplane Over the Sea. The performance is also noteworthy for being the public debut of "Oh Comely." The CD version has a QuickTime video of the performance on the enhanced section.

Track listing

Notes

External links
Live at Jittery Joe's at Orange Twin Records

2001 live albums